Dustin Joseph Watten (born October 27, 1986) is an American professional volleyball player, a former member of the US national team. He is the 2015 World Cup winner and the 2019 German Champion. At the professional club level, he plays for LUK Lublin.

Personal life
He is the son of Kim and Jeff Watten and has two brothers – Chris and Cody. In 2004, he graduated from Woodrow Wilson Classical High School in Long Beach. In 2009, he graduated from California State University, Long Beach.

Honours

Clubs
 National championships
 2018/2019  German Championship, with Berlin Recycling Volleys

Individual awards
 2012: Pan American Cup – Best Digger

References

External links
 Player profile at TeamUSA.org
 
 Player profile at PlusLiga.pl 
 Player profile at Volleybox.net

1986 births
Living people
Volleyball players from Long Beach, California
American men's volleyball players
American expatriate sportspeople in Finland
Expatriate volleyball players in Finland
American expatriate sportspeople in France
Expatriate volleyball players in France
American expatriate sportspeople in Brazil
Expatriate volleyball players in Brazil
American expatriate sportspeople in Poland
Expatriate volleyball players in Poland
American expatriate sportspeople in Germany
Expatriate volleyball players in Germany
Long Beach State Beach men's volleyball players
Czarni Radom players
GKS Katowice (volleyball) players
LKPS Lublin players
Liberos